Mysore Sandal Soap  is a brand of soap manufactured by the Karnataka Soaps and Detergents Limited (KSDL), a company owned by the government of Karnataka in India. This soap has been manufactured since 1916, when Krishna Raja Wadiyar IV, the king of Mysore, set up the Government Soap Factory in Bangalore. The main motivation for setting up the factory was the excessive sandalwood reserves that the Mysore Kingdom had, which could not be exported to Europe because of the First World War. In 1980, KSDL was incorporated as a company by merging the Government Soap Factory with the sandalwood oil factories at Shimoga and Mysore. Mysore Sandal Soap is the only soap in the world made from 100% pure sandalwood oil. KSDL owns a proprietary geographical indication  tag on the soap, which gives it intellectual property rights to use the brand name, to ensure quality, and to prevent piracy and unauthorised use by other manufacturers. In 2006, Mahendra Singh Dhoni, the Indian cricketer was selected as the first brand ambassador of the Mysore Sandal Soap.

History

In the early 20th century, the Mysore Kingdom in India was one of the largest producers of sandalwood in the world. It was also one of the major exporters of the wood, most of which was exported to Europe. During the First World War, large reserves of sandalwood were left over because they could not be exported due to the war. To make good use of these reserves, Nalvadi Krishnaraja Wodeyar, the king of Mysore, established the Government Soap Factory in Bangalore. This factory, which was set up in 1916, started manufacturing soaps under the brand name Mysore Sandal Soap using sandalwood oil as the main ingredient. A factory to distill sandalwood oil from the wood was set up at Mysore in the same year. In 1944, another sandalwood oil factory was set up at Shimoga. After the unification of Karnataka, these factories came under the jurisdiction of the government of Karnataka. In 1980, the Government decided to merge these factories and incorporate them under a company named Karnataka Soaps and Detergents Limited. Sharabha, a mythological creature having a body of a lion and the head of an elephant, was chosen as the logo of the company because the creature represents the combined virtues of wisdom, courage, and strength and symbolizes the company's philosophy. The company has since diversified, and manufactures incense sticks, talcum powder, and detergents, apart from soaps.

Business
As of March 2006, the Mysore Sandal Soap held a 6500-tonne share among the 450,000 tonnes of soap produced and marketed annually in India. The KSDL's soap factory in Bangalore that manufactures the Mysore Sandal Soap is one of the largest of its kind in India, having an installed capacity to produce 26,000 tonnes of soap per year. KSDL had sales of Rs 1.15 billion (about US$28.75 million) in 2004-2005, with the Mysore Sandal Soap having an average monthly sale of about Rs. 75 million ($1.87 million). Traditionally, the soap has not been marketed in a high-profile manner and only during 2006, M. S. Dhoni, the Indian cricketer, was selected as the first brand ambassador of the Mysore Sandal Soap. Other marketing strategies being employed to market this soap include a scheme where the distributors who meet the targeted sales could enter a drawing where they could win silver or gold coins. About 85% of the sales of this soap are from the South Indian states of Karnataka, Andhra Pradesh, and Tamil Nadu. Most users of this soap are above 40 years of age, and it has yet to gain more acceptance by the youth in India. Apart from the regular, Mysore Sandal Soap, KSDL has also introduced the Mysore Sandal baby soap to target this share of the market. However, KSDL is facing issues such as shortage of sandalwood, which has resulted in the company using only 25% of the manufacturing capacity of its factory and leading to reduced production. The main reason for this is the depletion of sandalwood reserves in Karnataka.

To overcome this, KSDL has also started procuring sandalwood by bidding in the open market, and is also considering importing the wood from other countries. The absence of a sustained sandalwood regeneration program has a taken a big toll on sandalwood reserves in Karnataka. This is a great irony in a state that once set up factories to use up its excessive reserves and wears two geographical indication tags on its sleeve on account of its historic association with the precious wood.

The company celebrated its centennial  on 10 May 2016. It planned a celebration to commemorate the year, and included plans to introduce a Mysore Sandal Centennial Soap to mark the occasion. Karnataka Soaps had an event on 10 May 2016 to commemorate the 100th year.

The makers of Mysore Sandal Soap launched on 4 November 2017, a new basket of soaps with brand name Mysoap in variants of Rose Milk Cream, Jasmine Milk Cream, Orange Lime, Cologne Lavender, and Fruity Floral. Each variety is exclusively packaged depicting ethnic Indian woman in traditional looks. The soap weighs 100 g.

See also
 Mysore Sandalwood Oil
 Mysore Agarbathi
 Mysore pak
 Bidriware
 Mysore Rosewood Inlay
 List of cleaning products

References

External links
 Mysore Sandal Soap Website

Economy of Karnataka
Indian soap brands
Mysore
Geographical indications in Karnataka